Daniel Salomon may refer to:

 Daniel Salomon (musician) (born 1973), Israeli pop rock singer and musician
 Daniel Salomon (politician) (born 1957), Republican member of the Montana Legislature